Idle Gossip is a full-length album by the punk band Toy Dolls.

Track listing
All writing by Michael "Olga" Algar. 
  "Idle Gossip"  – 2:33
  "Do You Wanna Be Like Dougy Bell"  – 2:39
  "The Lambrusco Kid"  – 3:28
  "You Won't Be Merry On A North Sea Ferry"  – 3:09
  "Harry Cross (A Tribute To Edna)"  – 3:44 (referring to a storyline in Brookside)
  "Geordie's Gone To Jail"  – 3:36
  "Silly Billy"  – 2:09
  "If You're In A Pop Group You'll End Up Paying A Fortune Practicing At Peter Practice's Practice Place"  – 2:56
  "PC Stoker"  – 2:56
  "I Tried To Trust Tracey"  – 3:40
  "Keith's A Thief"  – 2:05
  "I'll Get Even With Steven (Steve Is Tender)"  – 3:18

External links
 Full album lyrics
 Idle Gossip page on The Toy Dolls website

Personnel
 Michael "Olga" Algar - Vocals, Guitar
 Dean (James) Robson - Bass, Vocals
 Graham "Teddy" Edmundson - Drums, Vocals

Toy Dolls albums
1986 albums